"Dang!" is a song by American rapper Mac Miller featuring American rapper Anderson .Paak. It was released on July 28, 2016, as the lead single from Miller's fourth studio album The Divine Feminine (2016).

Composition 
Matthew Strauss of Pitchfork has described the song having an "addictive" funk instrumental that "features horns by Juilliard students." In an interview with Genius, Mac Miller revealed that Anderson .Paak "wrote the song for people who passed away."

Live performances
Miller and Paak performed "Dang!" on The Late Show with Stephen Colbert on September 15, 2016. At the One Love Manchester benefit concert on June 4, 2017, Miller performed the song with singer Ariana Grande, who subbed in for Paak.

Track listing 
 Digital download
 "Dang!" featuring Anderson .Paak – 5:05
 Digital download – Radio Edit
 "Dang!" (Radio Edit) featuring Anderson .Paak – 4:01

Credits and personnel 
Credits and personnel adapted from Tidal and The Divine Feminines liner notes.

Recording
 Recorded at Jungle City Studios (New York City) and Blast Off Productions (New York City)
 Mixed at Encore Recording Studios (Burbank, California)
 Mastered at Sterling Sound (New York City)

Personnel

 Mac Miller – lead vocals, songwriting
 Anderson .Paak – secondary vocals, songwriting
 David "Pomo" Pimentel – production, songwriting, bass guitar, drums, keyboards
 Danny McKinnon – guitar
 Braxton Cook – horn
 Enrique Sanchez – horn
 Jeffery Oliver – horn
 Julian Lee – horn
 Derek Ali – mixing
 Chris Gehringer – mastering
 Nicholas Cavalieri – recording
 Zeke Mishanec – recording
 Brendan Silas Parry – recording assistant

Charts

Certifications

References 

2016 singles
2016 songs
Mac Miller songs
Anderson .Paak songs
Warner Records singles
Songs written by Mac Miller
Songs written by Anderson .Paak